Dawgnation is an album by the David Grisman Quintet led by mandolinist David Grisman.

Track listing

Personnel
 David Grisman – mandolin, mandola
 Enrique Coria – guitar, whistle
 Matt Eakle – flute, bass flute
 Jim Kerwin – double bass
 Joe Craven – percussion, violin, mandolin

References

2002 albums
David Grisman albums
Acoustic Disc albums